Alien TV is an live action/CG animation series produced by Entertainment One and Pop Family Entertainment for Netflix. The plot revolves around a television news crew consisting of the extraterrestrials Ixbee, Pixbee and Squee, who are sent to learn about the planet Earth.

The series premiered on the Nine Network's multichannel 9Go! in Australia on 23 November 2019. A second season is scheduled for a March 19, 2021 release on Netflix. There are no plans for a season 3.

Cast 
 Rob Tinkler as Ixbee
 Julie Lemieux as Pixbee
 John Cleland as Squee
 Kyle Dooley as Squood
 Rupert Degas as Translator

Episodes

Series overview

Season 1 (2020)

Season 2 (2021)

References

External links 
 
 

2020 Australian television series debuts
2020 Canadian television series debuts
2020s Australian animated television series
2020s Canadian animated television series
9Go! original programming
Australian children's animated comic science fiction television series
Canadian children's animated comic science fiction television series
Australian computer-animated television series
Canadian computer-animated television series
English-language Netflix original programming
Netflix children's programming
Television series by Entertainment One
Animated television series about extraterrestrial life
Television series about alien visitations